Events from the year 1931 in Ireland.

Incumbents
 Governor-General: James McNeill
 President of the Executive Council: W. T. Cosgrave (CnaG)

Events
9 January – Ulster Canal abandoned.
12 February – sixteen members of the Ennis Dalcassian Gaelic Athletic Association club are expelled for attending the Ennis-Nenagh rugby match.
17 March – first St. Patrick's Day parade held in the Irish Free State, reviewed by Desmond FitzGerald, Minister of Defense.
3 April – persistent rainfall causes the banks of the River Lee to burst. Half the houses in Cork are flooded.
7 May – the Irish Youth Hostel Service, An Óige, is established.
17 May – Muintir na Tíre, the rural organisation, is founded by Canon John Hayes.
9 July – Dublin-born racing driver Kaye Don breaks the world water speed record at Lake Garda, Italy.
13 August – law books return to the rebuilt Four Courts where High Court business resumes after its destruction during the Civil War.
5 September – the first issue of The Irish Press, the newspaper of Fianna Fáil, goes on sale for 1d.
27 September – Saor Éire's first National Congress takes place in the Iona Hall in Dublin.
4 December – the derelict aerodrome at Collinstown in north County Dublin is considered as the site for a new civil airport.

Arts and literature
 13 October – Orson Welles makes his first professional stage debut, age 16, at the Gate Theatre, Dublin, with a leading rôle in an adaptation of Jew Süss.
 25 October – Ireland's first all-concrete Art Deco church, the Church of Christ the King, is opened at Turners Cross, Cork, designed by Chicago architect Barry Byrne with sculptor John Storrs.
 'Æ' (George William Russell) publishes Vale, and Other Poems.
 Samuel Beckett's Proust is published.
 Cecil Day-Lewis's poetry From Feathers To Iron is published.
 Lord Dunsany's The Travel Tales of Mr. Joseph Jorkens is published.
 Kate O'Brien's first novel, Without My Cloak, is published.
 Frank O'Connor's first short story collection, Guests of the Nation, is published.
 Francis Stuart's first novel, Women and God, is published.

Sport

Football

League of Ireland
Winners: Shelbourne
FAI Cup
Winners: Shamrock Rovers 1–1, 1–0 Dundalk

Golf
Irish Open is won by Bob Kenyon (England).

Births
1 January – Jimmy Smyth, Clare hurler (died 2013).
7 February – Cyril Haran, priest and Gaelic football manager (Sligo) (died 2014).
2 March – Paddy Cooney, solicitor, Fine Gael TD, Cabinet Minister and MEP.
9 March – Jackie Healy-Rae, Fianna Fáil. TD for Kerry South (died 2014).
9 April – Patrick Walsh, Bishop of Down and Connor (1991–2008).
30 May – John O'Brien, Catholic priest and musician (died 2008).
5 June – Laurence Forristal, Bishop of Ossory (1981–2007) (died 2018).
8 July – Thomas Flynn, Bishop of Achonry (1976–2007) (died 2015).
26 July – Paddy Harte, Fine Gael TD and Minister of State (died 2018).
29 July – Tom Mitchell, IRA activist and politician (died 2020).
1 August – Seán Ó Riada, composer and musician (died 1971).
11 August – Thomas Meaney, Fianna Fáil TD and Minister of State  (died 2022).
8 September – Desmond Guinness, architectural conservationist (died 2020).
20 September – Malachy McCourt, actor, writer and politician.
13 October – Jimmy O'Neill, soccer player (died 2007).
27 October – Seán Calleary, Fianna Fáil TD and Minister of State (died 2018).
28 November – Dervla Murphy, travel writer (died 2022).
10 December
Gustavus Hamilton-Russell, 10th Viscount Boyne, Irish peer, soldier and banker (died 1995).
Tom MacIntyre, poet and playwright (died 2019).
28 December – Mervyn Taylor, Labour Party TD and cabinet minister (died 2021).
Full date unknown
Mick Cashman, Cork hurler (died 1988).
Seán Kinsella, chef and restaurateur (died 2013).

Deaths
6 January – Harry Clarke, stained glass artist and book illustrator (born 1889).
19 January – Mary Elizabeth Byrne, literary scholar (born 1880).
7 March – Hamilton Lyster Reed, recipient of the Victoria Cross for gallantry in 1899 at the Battle of Colenso, South Africa (born 1869).
26 March – Timothy Michael Healy, Nationalist politician, journalist, author, barrister and first Governor-General of the Irish Free State (born 1855).
22 March – James Campbell, 1st Baron Glenavy, lawyer, Lord Chancellor of Ireland, first Chairman of Seanad Éireann (born 1851).
2 April – Katharine Tynan, novelist and poet (born 1861).
13 April – William Dowler Morris, mayor of Ottawa (born 1857).
22 April – Patrick Kenny, Independent member of the Seanad for 12 years from 1922.  Leas Ceann Comhairle 1928.
25 June – Con Lucid, Major League Baseball player (born 1874).
17 August – Pretty Polly, racehorse (born 1901).
27 August – Frank Harris, author, editor, journalist and publisher (born 1856).
29 September – William Orpen, painter (born 1878).
18 October – Reginald Clare Hart, soldier, recipient of the Victoria Cross for gallantry in 1879 in the Bazar Valley, Afghanistan (born 1848).
23 October – Peter de Loughry, member of 1922 Seanad, TD representing Carlow–Kilkenny from 1927 to 1931.
28 October – Paddy Glynn, Attorney General of Australia and Minister for External Affairs (born 1855).
27 December – Alfred Perceval Graves, writer (born 1846).

References

 
1930s in Ireland
Ireland
Years of the 20th century in Ireland